Câmpulung la Tisa (Ukrainian and Rusyn: Довге Поле) is a commune in Maramureș County, Maramureș, Romania. It is composed of a single village, Câmpulung la Tisa.

To the southwest is Piatra Săpânței Peak, in the Oaș Mountains. 

It is traversed by national road , which runs from Oradea to Sighetu Marmației.

At the 2011 census, 71.4% of inhabitants were Hungarians, 23.7% Romanians, 3.9% Roma, and 0.9% Ukrainians. At the 2002 census, 44.6% were Reformed, 22.3% Romanian Orthodox, 14.2% Greek-Catholic, 12.6% Roman Catholic, and 1.7% Adventist.

Câmpulung la Tisa is the birthplace of the former Romanian football player Emerich Dembrovschi, who scored a goal against Pelé's Brazil at the 1970 FIFA World Cup.

References

Communes in Maramureș County
Localities in Romanian Maramureș
Romania–Ukraine border crossings